Carlotta Truman (born 19 October 1999) is a German singer and a finalist in season 3 of Das Supertalent 2009 and The Voice Kids 2014. She represented Germany in the Eurovision Song Contest 2019 as part of the duo S!sters with the song "Sister", after winning the German national selection Unser Lied für Israel.

Career 
Truman had her first appearance on the stage at the age of one and a half. She was a finalist in the German version of Got Talent – Das Supertalent – at the age of nine. A tour of Germany followed, along with a live appearance in the National Television show Our Show For Germany. Since July 2011, she has become a regular soloist for the nationally recognised German Police Orchestra, including a performance for the German President at the Presidential Palace in Bonn (Villa Hammerschmidt). In December 2011 Truman was awarded the 29th German Rock and Pop prize for the Best Singer in Germany (the youngest ever) as well as picking up four other awards at the prestigious ceremony. In 2014 Truman was a contestant at the show The Voice Kids. She made it to the final and gained the second place.
She grew up in a German-British family.

In 2019, she represented Germany in the Eurovision Song Contest along with Laurita Spinelli as part of Sisters. They came 25th with 24 points. In February 2020, the duo disbanded.

She is currently part of electronic pop duo Amos Fleur with producer Simon Leander. Their debut single 'LYAR' was released in October 2021.

Discography 
 "All in the Game" feat. LayZee (2010)

Filmography 
 2019: In aller Freundschaft – Die jungen Ärzte
 2020: Nachtschwestern

Awards and nominations

References

External links 
 
 

1999 births
German child actresses
German child singers
German people of British descent
Child pop musicians
Living people
Musicians from Hanover
German women pop singers
The Voice Kids contestants
21st-century German women singers